The 2021–22 Air Force Falcons men's ice hockey season is the 54th season of play for the program and the 16th season in the Atlantic Hockey conference. The Falcons represented the United States Air Force Academy and were coached by Frank Serratore, in his 25th season.

Season
After the worst season for the program in 25 years and likely its most trying, Air Force returned to the ice ready to put COVID-19 in the past. At the start, senior netminder  and team co-captain, Alex Schilling, got the starting role but didn't perform particularly well. The Falcons got off to a 2–5–1 start with Schilling allowing nearly 5 goals a game on average. Despite the horrid start, Frank Serratore stuck with Schilling and the goals against slowly declined as the team got into its conference schedule.

A bad stretch at home in November sent the Falcons to the bottom of the Atlantic Hockey standings. While they recovered a bit by taking a series against Canisius, Air Force opened the second half of its season getting swept by American International. Fortunately, the rest of January was kind to the Falcons and they won five of their next six games to pull back into the middle of the pack. The team was up and down in the final month of the regular season and Air Force ended up 6th, guaranteeing them a bye into the conference quarterfinals, but making them do so on the road.

Air Force began its postseason against their fellow service academy, Army. The first game was a see-saw battle that saw both teams take two 1-goal leads. The Falcon offense opened up on Army's goal, firing 51 shots in nearly 4 periods of work and managed to earn the overtime victory. The second match was just as close with the teams again trading leads but, again, Air Force netted a goal in overtime to sweep the series and make the semifinals. Their match against RIT turned out to be a series of short-lived leads for Air Force as the Tigers tied the game quickly on three separate occasions. Near the mid-point of the third, however, the Falcons finally were able to hold onto their lead and fended RIT off for the final 10 minutes to send the team to the championship game. Air Force's season ended with a thud when the team was completely dominated by AIC, 0–7. The Falcons kept the game close initially, but the team got into penalty trouble, taking 40 minutes worth of infractions, and allowed four power play goals.

Departures

Recruiting

Roster
As of August 23, 2021.

Standings

Schedule and results

|-
!colspan=12 style=";" | Exhibition

|-
!colspan=12 style=";" | Regular Season

|-
!colspan=12 style=";" | 

|- align="center" bgcolor="#e0e0e0"
|colspan=12|Air Force Won Series 2–0

Scoring statistics

Goaltending statistics

Rankings

Note: USCHO did not release a poll in week 24.

Awards and honors

References

Air Force Falcons men's ice hockey seasons
Air Force Falcons
Air Force Falcons
Air Force Falcons men's ice hockey season
Air Force Falcons men's ice hockey season